Chester William Chapin (December 16, 1798 – June 10, 1883) was an American businessman, president of the Boston and Albany Railroad from 1868 to 1878, and U.S. Representative from Massachusetts.

Biography and career
Chester W. Chapin, six generations removed from the family's Puritan forebearer, Deacon Samuel Chapin, was born in Ludlow, Massachusetts, to Ephriam and Mary [Smith] Chapin, the youngest of seven children.

The family moved to Chicopee and in 1806 his father died, leaving Chester and his brothers to maintain the family and work their farm.  He attended common schools and Westfield Academy, Westfield, Massachusetts.  One of his first paying jobs was when local cotton mills were being built, when he earned $1.50 a day.  He quickly went into business for himself, opening a store, and in 1822 was appointed town tax collector, for which he received $80.

He married Dorcas [Chapin] Chapin on June 1, 1825; they had four children: Abel Dexter, Margaret, Anna, and Chester W.

Around 1826 he bought an interest in the stage line from Hartford, Connecticut, to Brattleboro, Vermont, and soon held extensive mail and stage contracts.  In 1831, when steamboats began to run on the river between Hartford and Springfield, Massachusetts, he bought an interest, soon became sole proprietor, and for about 15 years controlled all the passenger traffic on that route. He also became a large or principal owner of the steamship lines between New York City, Hartford, and New Haven, Connecticut. He later extended his interests into railroads and banking, becoming founder, principal, or president of many companies, including the Western Railroad, the Agawam (National) Bank, and the Connecticut River Railroad. He was one of the earliest advocates of a bridge over the Hudson River at Albany, New York.  He served as president and a director of the Western Railroad Corporation from 1854 to 1867, president of the Boston and Albany Railroad from 1868 to 1878, and a director until 1880.

Before his time in Congress, Chapin served as a delegate of the Massachusetts Constitutional Convention of 1853 and, as a War Democrat, purchased the uniforms of the 10th Regiment Massachusetts Volunteer Infantry at the outset of the American Civil War. Chapin was elected as a Democrat to the Forty-fourth Congress (March 4, 1875 – March 3, 1877), and served on the Committee of Ways And Means.
He ran unsuccessfully for reelection in 1876.

He died in Springfield on June 10, 1883, and was interred in Springfield Cemetery.

In 1881, Chapin commissioned sculptor Augustus Saint-Gaudens to produce a sculpture of his forefather, Deacon Samuel Chapin; the end result, The Puritan, was not released until 1887, four years after Chester Chapin's death.

The New York, New Haven & Hartford Railroad Company / New England Steamship company (Providence Line) passenger steamer Chester W. Chapin of 1899 (served until 1923) was named after him.

See also
Yampa
List of railroad executives

Notes

References

 Chapin, Charles Wells. "Sketches of the Old Inhabitants and Other Citizens of Old Springfield of the Present Century, and its Historic Mansions of 'Ye Olden Tyme,' with One Hundred and Twenty-Four Illustrations and Sixty Autographs" Press of Springfield Printing and Binding Company, 1893. Springfield MA.
 Chapin, Gilbert Warren. "The Chapin Book of Genealogical Data with Brief Biographical Sketches of the Descendants of Deacon Samuel Chapin; Vol. I: First Seven Generations and Vol. II: Eighth to Twelfth Generation". Chapin Family Association, 1924.  Hartford, CT.
 Noon, Alfred. "Ludlow: A Century and a Centennial, Comprising a Sketch of the History of the Town of Ludlow, Hampden County, Massachusetts, Together with an Account of the Celebration by the Town of Its Centennial Anniversary, June 17, 1875.'' C. W. Bryan and Co., 1875.

Historical websites

1798 births
1883 deaths
19th-century American railroad executives
Boston and Albany Railroad
Democratic Party members of the United States House of Representatives from Massachusetts
19th-century American politicians
People from Ludlow, Massachusetts